The Roshel Senator is a wheeled military armoured car produced by Roshel of Canada, based on a Ford F-550 chassis. As an APC, it is designed to protect against small arms fire. While designed as effectively a highly versatile SWAT platform, for peacekeeping and law enforcement activities, it is also capable of light duty as an armoured personnel carrier (APC) or infantry mobility vehicle (IMV). Roshel classifies it as an APC. Production began in April 2018, with the vehicle slated to enter active service later that year.

History
In 2020, during the Crew Dragon Demo-2 test flight, Senators were used to defend astronauts Bob Behnken and Doug Hurley.

In 2022, many newly-built Senators were shipped to Ukraine as part of military aid packages to the Ukrainian government during the Russian invasion. Some of the donated Senators have been deployed by the State Border Service of Ukraine. In response to the increase in demand, Roshel plans to ramp production to 1,000 vehicles a year. This was the first time the vehicle was used for combat.

In January 2023, Canada announced an aid package to Ukraine worth $90 million CAD ($67.3 million USD) for 200 Senators. That same month, the Interior Minister of Tuzla Canton in Bosnia and Herzegovina announced that it had acquired four Senators for police use.

Operators

Current operators
  – Acquired four vehicles in January 2023.
 
  – Received eight vehicles in May 2022, and will receive 200 more as part of aid package from Canada.
 
 NASA

References

External links
 Roshel Senator

See also

 M1151
 MRAP

Armoured cars
Wheeled armoured personnel carriers
Military trucks of Canada